This is a list of lighthouses in the Dominican Republic.

Lighthouses

See also
 Lists of lighthouses and lightvessels

References

External links
 

Dominican republic
Lighthouses

Lighthouses